Laidlaw is an unincorporated settlement in the Upper Fraser Valley region of British Columbia, Canada, located just west of the westernmost boundary of Hope, British Columbia on the south side of the Fraser River and along the Trans-Canada Highway.

Laidlaw is the base of the only road into Wahleach Lake (commonly known as Jones Lake).

Originally known as St. Elmo, when the Canadian Northern Railway laid two tracks across the farm of W.F. Laidlaw he insisted the station be given his name.

Climate

Demographics
 Population: 915
 Growth Rate (2011–2016): 26.9%
 Total Private Dwellings: 726
 Area: 3,087.25 km2.
 Density: 0.3 people per km2.

References

External links
Bulletin 48: Landforms of British Columbia, A Physiographic Outline, Plate XIIIA, Cascade Mountains, Skagit Range, Looking east up the Fraser River from the vicinity of Laidlaw, looking towards Hope.  Skagit Range at right, Hozameen Range in distance - Laidlaw is at lower left, Seabird Island and Ruby Creek at left.  The valley of Wahleach Creek (Jones Creek) is at near right (see Wahleach Lake).

Unincorporated settlements in British Columbia
Lower Mainland
Populated places in the Fraser Valley Regional District
Populated places on the Fraser River
Designated places in British Columbia